The Cathedral of the Immaculate Conception is a Catholic church and is located in the city of Chanthaburi, in the province of the same name, in Thailand. It is "the most famous and picturesque building of Chanthaburi" and the witness of French presence in the city.

History
The cathedral of the Immmaculate Conception is the fourth church built on the spot by the Catholic community in Chanthaburi. The first Catholic community followed the Siamese in exile after the fall of Ayutthaya in 1767.

In 1901, the Christians belonging to Chanthaburi numbered 2,500; in 1904, helped by his vicars, a French missionary, Father Augustin Peyrical began the construction of a new church. On the death of Father Quentric, Father Peyrical was appointed parish priest of Banpeng, the deceased having given him by will a part of his inheritance to build the new church in Chanthabury. Due to disagreements with Msgr. Jean-Louis Vey, the apostolic vicar of Siam, who had views on this heritage, Father Peyrical did not go to Banpeng, but to Paris and Rome to defend his rights, and Rome agreed with him. Back in Siam in 1910, he was appointed parish priest of Chanthaburi by Mgr. René Perros. His district was faced with epidemics of cholera and plague in quick succession, but will hold firm. In 1921, Father Peyrical was appointed Apostolic Vicar of Laos, but he declined the honor and the office: it was Father Gouin who accepted. Despite the material difficulties in maintaining the schools, the number of Christians continued to increase and in 1928, Father proceeded to bless a new church and a cemetery in Rayong. When Father Peyrical died on September 3, 1929 in Chanthaburi, he was buried in the cemetery next to his church, the largest in Thailand.

On December 23, 1945, Pope Pius XII erected the apostolic vicariate of Chanthaburi and therefore the church of the Immaculate Conception became a cathedral with a canonical chapter.

Sinc 1965, it serves as the Latin rite seat of the Diocese of Chanthaburi (Dioecesis Chanthaburiensis, สังฆมณฑล จันทบุรี) created with the Bull "Qui in fastigio" of Pope Paul VI. It is under the pastoral responsibility of the Bishop Silvio Siripong Charatsri.

Architecture
The cathedral, visible from most of the city, was formally inaugurated in 1909 as one of the largest Catholic churches in Thailand. It was constructed in Gothic style during the 10 years of occupation by France.

The shape of the Cathedral with a central nave, two side alleys, a narthex, and two twin spires is an exemplary form of neo-Gothic expression.

Devotion

The influence of French and Vietanmese Catholic spirituality 

The French and Vietnamese influence is clearly visible in the Cathedral of the Immaculate Conception.

Stained glasses representing the French king Saint Louis as well as national hero Joan of Arc recall the French occupation of the city at the beginning of the twentieth century. Three other stained glasses in an oculus represending the blessed martyrs as Theophane Venard, Auguste Chapdelaine of the Paris Foreign Missions Society are a legacy of the French builders of this sanctuary.

The carved altars painted in red and gold are typical of Vietnamese Catholicism. The side altars devoted to the Sacred Heart and Saint Joseph are a reminder of the first Vietnamese Catholic community in Chanthaburi.

A Catholic hub for Thailand 
The Cathedral of Chanthaburi has become a major for the Catholic Church in Thailand. Flanked by the bishop's residence as well as many Catholic schools and the Fatima House, i.e. the general house of the Lovers of the Cross of Chanthaburi, the cathedral is at the center of a diocese where the Catholic population reaches a national high for Thailand of around ten percent of the overall population.

A major shrine of Marian devotion 

The Cathedral, which is dedicated to the Immaculate Conception, is a unique expression of Thai Marian devotion.

There is a statue of the Virgin Mary in front of the Cathedral.

The centre piece of the inside of the cathedral is the statue of the Virgin Mary. It is covered by semi precious gems donated by the local congregation – estimates of the number of gems range from 200,000 to 500,000.

See also

Roman Catholicism in Thailand

References

Roman Catholic cathedrals in Thailand
Buildings and structures in Chanthaburi province
Roman Catholic churches completed in 1909
Gothic Revival church buildings in Thailand
Unregistered ancient monuments in Thailand
20th-century Roman Catholic church buildings in Thailand